Muhannad Awadh  (born 27 May 1992) is a Saudi Arabian professional footballer who plays as a midfielder for Al-Qadsiah.

External links

References

1992 births
Living people
Saudi Arabian footballers
Ittihad FC players
G.D. Tourizense players
Al-Orobah FC players
Najran SC players
Al-Wehda Club (Mecca) players
Al-Watani Club players
Al-Nojoom FC players
Al-Kawkab FC players
Al-Fayha FC players
Al-Bukayriyah FC players
Al Jeel Club players
Al-Entesar Club players
Al-Qadsiah FC players
Saudi Professional League players
Campeonato de Portugal (league) players
Saudi First Division League players
Saudi Second Division players
Expatriate footballers in Portugal
Saudi Arabian expatriate sportspeople in Portugal
Saudi Arabian expatriate footballers
Sportspeople from Jeddah
Association football midfielders